Merited Artist of the Russian Federation (Zasluzhenny artist Rossiyskoy Federatsii) is an honorary title in the Russian Federation. The title is awarded to actors, directors, filmmakers, writers, dancers and singers for exceptional achievements in the arts.

The honorary title was originally modeled after the German honorific title for distinguished opera singers. Historically, the title was bestowed by princes or kings, when it was styled Hofkammersänger(in). In Imperial Russia before 1917, several stars of stage and film were honored with the title "Imperial singer", but after the October Revolution of 1917, the new regime made changes and established the title of the Marited Artist of Russia (Russian SFSR and Soviet Union). After the collapse of the USSR in 1991, Russian president Boris Yeltsin created a new award, first presented on December 30, 1995.

See also
People's Artist
People's Artist of Russia
Merited Artist (Albania)
Merited Artist of Ukraine
Merited Artist of Vietnam

References

Awards established in 1995
Honorary titles
Merited Artists